= Herbosa =

Town in Castile and León, Spain

Herbosa is a town in the Province of Burgos, within the Autonomous community of Castile and León, in central Spain.

According to the census, it has a population of 695.
